Ron Craig (died 30 November 2009) was the chairman of Bristol Rovers Football Club for sixteen months between April 2007 and August 2008, and spent 23 years on the board of directors.

Craig first joined the board of the football club in 1986, when Denis Dunford became chairman, and later became vice-chairman when Dunford's son Geoff Dunford succeeded him. When Dunford Jr. stepped down in April 2007 Craig took over as chairman until Nick Higgs took the position in 2008, and after this he remained on the board of directors until his death late in 2009.

While at Bristol Rovers he had a special interest in the community and youth football departments of the club, but was forced to step back from his role after suffering a heart attack in February 2009. Although he recovered from this, he died in November 2009 following a short illness.

Sources

Year of birth missing
2009 deaths
English football chairmen and investors
Bristol Rovers F.C. chairmen and investors